The A1 or ARA-A1 is a  long motorway in Aragon, Spain connecting Villafranca de Ebro (roundabout with N-II) and El Burgo de Ebro (roundabout with N-232) via a junction with AP-2. It is a partial beltway around Zaragoza, and is operational since 2008.

Transport in Aragon